Eliza Ann Brown ( Eliza Annie Palmer; 28 March 1847 – 23 April 1923) of Invercargill organised and became the first president of the first Woman's Christian Temperance Union (WCTU) branch in New Zealand.

Early life
Eliza Annie Palmer was born in Sydney, New South Wales, Australia on 28 March 1847 to Marianne and James Hugh Palmer. Her mother traveled back to England alone with her six children – they are listed in the 1851 and 1861 census eventually living in Bideford. In 1877 Eliza Annie married Charles William Brown of Invercargill in New Zealand. Brown, a land broker and freeholder in his own right, was a leader in the Independent Order of Rechabites and a provisional director for the Invercargill Temperance Hotel Company. They had several children. Their eldest son Ernest Harrington Brown died 6 January 1909 aged 29 years old.

Temperance leader
A faithful reader of the WCTU's American newspaper, Union Signal, Eliza Ann Brown organized a local chapter on 6 August 1884 at the Don Street Primitive Methodist Church. The founding treasurer was Mrs. R.P. Magoun, the collector was Mrs. D. Strang, and Margaret Lennie, secretary. The organising meeting established a committee of fourteen women who were to carry out the eight objects of the Union, including gathering signatures for a petition for women's suffrage. After the Auckland WCTU formed in February 1885 under the direction of Mary Clement Leavitt, the first World WCTU missionary, Brown also organised a petition drive in Invercargill to support the abolishment of barmaids.

By the time Leavitt visited Invercargill in April 1885 bringing with her the American WCTU constitution and news of the New Zealand national WCTU forming under the leadership of Anne Ward, Brown helped reconstitute the Invercargill WCTU on 22 June 1885 to affiliate with the new national umbrella organisation: the Women's Christian Temperance Union of New Zealand (WCTU NZ). By then, the club had grown to 76 members. Brown then stepped down as president in deference to the new Baptist minister's wife Roberta Annie Swayne Hinton (1836–1905) being elected the new president, but Brown remained in the newly formed chapter as secretary.

Women's rights activist
Signing at the top of the WCTU NZ petition sheet for Avenal (the area in Invercargill where she lived), Brown took a leadership role in the historic process of winning the right to vote for women at the national level – the world's first. In the fall of 1893, when women were registering to vote in the national elections, WCTU NZ member Mary S. Powell remembered that "Mrs. Brown was at our door with a cab at 9 a.m."

Death
Eliza Ann Brown died on 23 April 1923, and she was buried in Invercargill at the Eastern Cemetery next to her husband and eldest son.

See also
Mary Greenleaf Clement Leavitt
Temperance movement in New Zealand
Timeline of women's suffrage
Women's Christian Temperance Union of New Zealand

References

Further reading

1847 births
1923 deaths
New Zealand temperance activists
People from Invercargill
New Zealand feminists
New Zealand suffragists
19th-century New Zealand people
Woman's Christian Temperance Union people
20th-century New Zealand people
20th-century New Zealand women
19th-century New Zealand women
Burials at Eastern Cemetery, Invercargill